Muhammad Hakeme Yazid bin Said (born 8 February 2003) is a Bruneian footballer who plays as a forward for DPMM FC of the Singapore Premier League. The youngest brother of international player Shah Razen Said et al., he scored on his professional league debut in 2019 at the age of 16.

Club career

Once a student of Rimba II Secondary School, Hakeme followed his brothers' footsteps (eight of them) in getting into football from the age of 13, turning out for Tabuan A in national youth tournaments. Hakeme's team became youth league champions and cup winners in 2017. They were then invited to participate in the 2017–18 Brunei FA Cup where they managed to reach the quarterfinals, faring better than their two senior teams.

At the start of 2019, Hakeme signed a contract to play for DPMM FC in the 2018-19 Brunei Premier League, returning to the local scene after an absence of 14 years. He scored the professional youth team's first goal in the 30th minute against Rimba Star FC on 8 January in a 4–0 victory. After 7 games, Hakeme scored nine goals to win the league's golden boot. DPMM also became champions of the league. He also managed to score a hat-trick against Rainbow FC in the qualifying round of the 2018–19 Brunei FA Cup on 27 January.

The head coach of DPMM's first team, Adrian Pennock, kept an eye on Hakeme and promoted him to the first team in the second half of the 2019 Singapore Premier League season, perhaps conveniently after the acquisition of a returning Adi Said from his spell at UiTM FC. An injury to striker Andrey Varankow enabled Pennock to give the youngster his first-team debut against Geylang International on 2 August, withdrawing Adi to the bench after a rusty performance against Home United the week before. At the start of the second half, Hakeme stole the ball deep in the Eagles' back line and broke the deadlock with a debut goal, which at 16 years and 175 days of age was only a day longer than Hariss Harun's youngest goalscorer record for the Singapore leagues. The goal helped DPMM to emerge as 3–0 victors at the Hassanal Bolkiah National Stadium.

In the 2021 season DPMM competed domestically with their first team. Hakeme came on as a substitute in DPMM's first match of the season, scoring a goal in a 16–1 demolition of BAKES FC.

Hakeme played regularly for DPMM at the 2022 Brunei FA Cup, scoring 15 goals that year. He scored five goals against Seri Wira in their opening group game on 13 August which finished 18–0. Upon his return from international duty, he scored four goals in a 15–0 rout over Jerudong FC on 1 October in the first knockout stage of the Cup. He scored in every round since, including the winner in the first leg of the semi-final against Kota Ranger FC. He played from the start in the final against Kasuka FC where his brother Shahrazen netted the winner deep in the second half to secure a 2–1 win. At the end of the match, Hakeme was awarded the Young Player of the Tournament.

DPMM returned to the Singapore Premier League in the 2023 season, and in their first match in three years which was away against Lion City Sailors Hakeme equalised in the 62nd minute to draw 1–1 before being stretchered off 10 minutes later. The match ended 3–1 to the home team.

International career

Youth national teams
Hakeme's first international tournament with the Young Wasps was the 2017 AFF U-15 Championship held in Thailand in July 2017. Under Stephen Ng Heng Seng, Brunei U15 managed to finish fourth out of 6 teams, with five points in as many games. Hakeme was ever-present for Brunei at the tournament playing at centre-back. Two months later, the same team set off to Chinese Taipei for the 2018 AFC U-16 Championship qualification Group F matches which were hosted there. Hakeme scored a goal in the first match, a 4–0 victory against Macau on 16 September. Brunei finished third in the group after another win against Hong Kong in their fourth and last match pushed them to 6 points.

A day after scoring in his DPMM FC first-team debut, Hakeme was announced to be joining Brunei U18 for the 2019 AFF U-18 Youth Championship held in Vietnam in August 2019. He played in four matches without finding the back of the net for the Young Wasps.

In November 2019 Hakeme was called up to the national under-23 side competing in the 30th SEA Games held in the Philippines at the end of the month. Three years later he was with the same age group competing in the 2022 AFF U-23 Championship held in Cambodia in February 2022. He managed to score solitary goals against Timor-Leste and the Philippines in the three games contested by the Young Wasps.

Hakeme returned to the national Under-19 side competing at the 2022 AFF U-19 Youth Championship in Indonesia in early July 2022. He played in all five matches but failed to find the net despite being touted as the main attacking threat. In the following September the same team travelled to Bishkek, Kyrgyzstan for the 2023 AFC U-20 Asian Cup qualifying. The Young Wasps lost all three games without scoring a goal even with Hakeme starting every match as captain.

Full national team
In March 2022, Hakeme was announced to be traveling to Laos with the national team for an international friendly to be played at the end of the month. He debuted for the Wasps in a playmaking role, and scored with a direct free-kick in the second half but the game ultimately was won by Laos with a 3–2 score. He earned his second cap in another friendly against Malaysia two months later which ended 4–0 to the Malayan Tigers.

In late September 2022 Brunei hosted a tri-nation tournament involving the Maldives and Laos and named Hakeme in the squad despite returning from Kyrgyzstan just days before. He came on for the debuting Haziq Kasyful Azim Hasimulabdillah at the hour mark for the match against the Maldives that resulted in a 0–3 loss for the Wasps on 21 September. Six days later, he was played from the start against Laos and this time came out as victors with a 1–0 win courtesy of a Nazirrudin Ismail goal.

In November 2022 Hakeme made the starting lineup in both matches of the two-legged 2022 AFF Mitsubishi Electric Cup qualification against Timor-Leste. Brunei advanced to the group stage of the Cup with a 6–3 aggregate win. Hakeme made four appearances for the Wasps in the tournament in which Brunei failed to gain a single point from matches against Thailand, the Philippines, Indonesia and Cambodia.

International goals

Honours

Team
Tabuan A
NFABD U-16 Elite Youth Cup: 2017
NFABD U-16 National Youth League: 2017

DPMM FC
Brunei Premier League: 2018–19
Singapore Premier League: 2019
Brunei FA Cup: 2022

Individual
2018–19 Brunei Premier League top scorer - 9 goals
2022 Brunei FA Cup Young Player of the Tournament

Personal life 
Hakeme Yazid has eight elder brothers who are all footballers. The eldest is Shah Razen who plays for Kasuka FC, followed by Amalul of Kota Ranger FC, Ahmad Hafiz of IKLS-MB5 FC, Adi of Kasuka FC, Abdul Azim of AKSE Bersatu, Amirul Sabqi formerly of Rimba Star FC, Amiruddin Nizam formerly of Menglait FC and Abdul Mateen of Liang Lumut Belait ST.

References

External links

2003 births
Living people
Association football forwards
Bruneian footballers
Brunei international footballers
DPMM FC players
Competitors at the 2019 Southeast Asian Games
Southeast Asian Games competitors for Brunei